Pnau is the third studio album by Australian dance music duo, Pnau. The album was released on 12 November 2007 on the independent record label etcetc in Australia and on the independent record label Pnau Records and Tapes on LP in the UK in 2009. The album peaked at 31 on the Australian albums chart and was featured at number 89 on the Triple J Hottest 100 Albums of All Time.

At the J Awards of 2007, the album was nominated for Australian Album of the Year.

Shortly after the album's release, Elton John claimed the album to be the greatest record he had heard in ten years. Subsequently, Pnau was signed to Elton's management, which resulted in their heavily publicised apprenticeship under the music icon.

Additionally, Pnau reunited Nick Littlemore with Luke Steele for the first time in nearly a decade for the album tracks "With You Forever" and "Freedom". According to Littlemore, the track "With You Forever" inspired the artists to collaborate on a side project, which finalised a year later into the electronic pop band Empire of the Sun.

The album also features Ladyhawke (who at the time of this album's release was only previously known for her collaboration with Nick Littlemore as part of the art rock duo Teenager), Feadz, Nick Yannikas of Lost Valentinos, and Michael Di Francesco of Van She.

Track listing

Charts

Release history

References

2007 albums
Pnau albums